R v Blaue (1975) 61 Cr App R 271 is an English criminal law appeal in which the Court of Appeal decided, being a court of binding precedent thus established, that the refusal of a Jehovah's Witness to accept a blood transfusion after being stabbed did not constitute an intervening act for the purposes of legal causation.  This upheld the decision of Mocatta  in the court below.

Facts and legal processes
The defendant entered the home of an 18-year-old woman and asked for sex. When she declined his advances, he stabbed her four times; one wound penetrated her lung which necessitated both a blood transfusion and surgery to save her life. After refusing treatment because of her religious beliefs as a Jehovah's Witness, she died. The prosecution conceded that she would not have died if she had received treatment.

The prosecution did not challenge unrelated evidence that the defendant was suffering from diminished responsibility which reduced murder to manslaughter, decreasing the starting point for any sentencing.

Examined in his case, counsel for the Crown accepted the refusal to have a blood transfusion was a cause of the death. The defence argued that the refusal to accept medical treatment broke the chain of causation (in modern comparative and ancient law in Latin this is called a novus actus interveniens) between the stabbing and her death.

Appeal as to homicide on the basis of causation
The defence and court system saw an appeal heard within 9 months, with its judgment pronounced a month later, and did not dispute the second-count wounding conviction (resulting from a separate charge).

Lawton LJ (the most senior judge on the panel) ruled that, as a matter of public policy, "those who use violence on others must take their victims as they find them," invoking the thin-skull rule. The defendant's conviction of manslaughter was upheld.

See also
 Jehovah's Witnesses and blood transfusions

References

B
1975 in England
1975 in case law
Court of Appeal (England and Wales) cases
Jehovah's Witnesses litigation
1975 in British law
Christianity and law in the 20th century
Medical lawsuits